University College Birmingham is a university in Birmingham, England. It was awarded full university status in 2012 along with Newman University. It is not a member of Universities UK. The university was awarded 'University of the Year' in the 2022 WhatUni Student Choice Awards, as well as coming first in the 'Student Support' category.

The university is located in central Birmingham and offers both vocational and academic education at both undergraduate and postgraduate level. The university specialises in the areas of hospitality and the culinary arts, hairdressing and beauty, tourism, business enterprise, marketing, business management, accounting, finance, events management, sports management, sports medicine, sports therapy and Early Years education.

History 
The university was founded as part of Birmingham's Municipal Technical School (predecessor of Aston University) in the 19th century, but became a separate College of Bakery, Catering, Domestic Science and Associated Studies (later Birmingham College of Food and Domestic Arts) under the control of Birmingham City Council in 1957. It moved to its present site in Summer Row from Brasshouse Passage in 1967, with the official opening in 1968. It was renamed Birmingham College of Food, Tourism and Creative Studies (BCFTCS) in the 1980s to reflect the breadth of courses it by then offered. Its name was changed again, to University College Birmingham (UCB), in 2007. It is often colloquially known as the College of Cakes or sometimes simply “cakes and pies”.

As part of a general re-organisation of further education in the United Kingdom, the college became independent of council control on 1 April 1993. Continued expansion led to the college being re-classified as part of the higher education sector from 1 August 2002, although it continues to offer further education courses as well.

The college had awarded University of Birmingham degrees as a university college. The college was granted the right to award its own degrees by the Privy Council in November 2007. In January 2008 this was reflected when it was renamed University College Birmingham. Full university status was awarded in 2012.

Locations and facilities 

The university has buildings at Summer Row and Newhall Street, as well as the Postgraduate Centre at George Street. 

In addition, the university has halls of residence, with space for 872 students, at The Maltings and Cambrian Hall, which are both situated just off Broad Street, the main entertainment district in the city. The new development at The Maltings also includes a sports hall, shop and student bar, Joshuas.

The university has a range of specialist facilities including training restaurants, a fully equipped health and leisure club, libraries, hairdressing and beauty therapy salons, food and beverage test laboratories, a video production suite, demonstration theatres and computer suites including a facility for Early Years students.

The college opened a second teaching building in 2001 at Richmond House, in nearby Newhall Street which houses its hairdressing and beauty salons and sports therapy suites, both of which are open to the public. Further education courses in sport and tourism are also taught there. In 2014, UCB opened its new Postgraduate Centre at George Street, a dedicated teaching and research facility for its postgraduate students.

Academic profile

In  the university had  students in higher education, including  postgraduates and  undergraduates. There are also currently 10,335 further education students, around 10% of whom are from outside the United Kingdom. UCB was rated as 'outstanding' by OFSTED in 2009. It is also one of the few universities or colleges in the UK with Hospitality Assured status. It also currently holds the Beacon Status, Catey Education and Training Award, Investors in People, Charter Mark and the Matrix award.

Industrial placements 
All of the university's courses include opportunities to obtain work experience, and many degree-level courses give the option of a 48-week paid placement, which takes place approximately halfway through the course. The type of organisation reflects the interests of the student as well as the requirements of the programme being studied – for example, hospitality students may choose to work in hotels, restaurants, country clubs, theme parks, conference and exhibition venues, leisure centres, all-inclusive resorts, or in contract and retail caterers.

Many students undertake their placement in the UK, but there are also many opportunities available each year elsewhere in Europe, as well as the United States and Canada. Typically, students work in a number of departments to gain first-hand experience of different parts of the operation.

Student life 
The Student Services Unit exists to provide a range of services including the day-to-day operation of two halls of residence, career advice and guidance from the Careers and Employability Centre, the administration of Learner (Access) Support Fund, advice and support with finding and funding childcare, full-time counselling and nursing services and academic support for students from their Learning and Skills Development Centre. The Unit runs an accommodation database for students who wish to live in the private sector and provides guidance and administrative support to international students in areas such as visa applications.

The Learning and Skills Development Centre co-ordinates support for students with additional needs. The Centre is able to liaise with external agencies including Local Education Authorities on behalf of the student. It can also carry out an initial assessment for dyslexia and will refer students to an Educational Psychologist if necessary.

The Student Guild is run by a team of eight, making up the Student Guild Executive, all elected by other students at the university. The principal aims of the guild are to represent the student body within the university, to provide guidance and advice to students and to organise an ongoing programme of social and sporting activities.

The Student Guild participates in a variety of sporting activities such as cricket, football, rugby union, hockey, basketball, netball and Jitsu with teams competing against rival universities in the British Universities Sports Association leagues in the Midlands area. The Guild also promotes a number of weekly social activities and yearly events such as the Summer Ball, Christmas and New Year's Eve parties and a charity week.

References

External links 

 
Education in Birmingham, West Midlands
Learning and Skills Beacons
Educational institutions established in 1957
1957 establishments in England